Hypodoxa erebusata is a moth of the family Geometridae first described by Francis Walker in 1860. It is found in Australia, including Queensland.

The wingspan is about 40 mm. Adults are grey with a dark spot near the center of each wing.

The larvae feed on Melaleuca quinquenervia.

References

Moths described in 1860
Pseudoterpnini